Lee Sang-hyeok (born May 7, 1996), better known as Faker, is a South Korean professional League of Legends player for T1. Formerly known as GoJeonPa on the Korean League of Legends server, he was picked up by T1, then called SK Telecom T1 (SKT), in 2013 and has played as the team's mid laner since. Commonly referred to as "the Michael Jordan of esports", he is widely considered to be the best League of Legends player of all time. He has won 10 League of Legends Champions Korea (LCK) titles, two Mid-Season Invitational (MSI) titles, and three World Championship titles.

Faker grew up in Gangseo District, Seoul and was signed by SKT in 2013. He soon established himself as one of the league's premier players, winning both an LCK title and World Championship title with SKT that year. He followed up those achievements with five more LCK titles from 2014 to 2017, two MSI titles in 2016 and 2017, and two more World Championships in 2015 and 2016. In that time, he also won the All-Star Paris 2014 and the IEM World Championship in 2016. From 2019 to 2022, Faker had won four more LCK titles, becoming the first player to reach a total of 10. He was also selected to play for the South Korean national team at the 2018 Asian Games, winning a silver medal.

Faker's individual accolades and accomplishments include one World Championship Most Valuable Player (MVP) award, one MSI MVP award, two LCK season MVP awards, and one LCK First-All Pro Team designation. He is the first player to have reached 1,000, 2,000, and 2,500 kills, the first to have played 700 games, and the first to have won 500 games in the LCK. He is also holds the record for most kills in World Championship matches and is the first player to have won 100 World Championship games. In 2017, Faker was named the best esports player at The Game Awards. In 2019, he was named to Forbes 30 Under 30 list in Asia Entertainment & Sports. Faker was also inducted into the Esports Hall of Fame in 2019.

Faker is one of the most marketed esports figures, appearing in numerous commercials and talk shows. He became a part-owner and executive for T1 Entertainment & Sports in 2020.

Early life 
Faker was born in Seoul on May 7, 1996. He and his brother were raised by their grandparents and their father, Lee Kyung-joon, in Gangseo District, Seoul. Described as an introverted child by his father, He was an autodidact, often solving Rubik's cubes and self-learning foreign languages. He did not play computer games often as a child, preferring to play games such as Tekken and King of Fighters at a local arcade. He did, however, begin playing PC games such as Maplestory and Warcraft III later on.

Faker started playing League of Legends after it was released in Korea in 2011 and quickly became adept at the game. Shortly after starting high school at Mapo High School — the same high school that fellow esports gamer Kim "Deft" Hyuk-kyu attended —  he asked his father if he could drop out of school to pursue a career in esports, and one month later, his father allowed him to.

Professional career

Rookie season success (2013) 

SK Telecom T1 2 (later known as SK Telecom T1 K), one of three teams under the SK Telecom T1 umbrella, signed Faker as their starting mid laner in 2013, after scouting him from the competitive ladder. Faker, who had been playing under the alias GoJeonPa at the time, then changed his alias to Faker. He made his professional debut at a TV studio in Seoul, South Korea, on April 6, 2013, in a match where he solo killed South Korean All-Star mid laner Kang "Ambition" Chan-yong. In his first professional tournament, OGN Champions Korea 2013 Spring, Faker accounted for 31.6% of his team's kills and secured 133 kills over 20 games, the third highest in the tournament for both statistics. In the following split, OGN Champions Korea 2013 Summer, SKT T1 2 advanced to the to the tournament finals, where they faced the KT Rolster Bullets. One of the most famous League of Legends play of all time occurred in game five of the series, when Faker, fighting against the Bullets Yoo "Ryu" Sang-wook, nearly died, but Faker responded with a series of moves to turn the fight around and kill Ryu. The play helped close out a reverse sweep over KTR, giving Faker his first major title. In Fall of 2013, SKT T1 2 advanced to the Season 3 World Championship (usually shortened to simply Worlds), the top international League of Legends tournament series. The team went  throughout the tournament and swept China's Royal Club in the finals in what was one of the most one-sided finals in League of Legends history.

Five more international titles (2014–2017) 
Faker won his second domestic title in 2014, as SKT followed their 2013 success by going the entire OGN Champions Winter 2013–2014 season without losing a single game. After losing in the quarterfinals of Champions Spring 2014, the team won All-Star Paris 2014, the precursor to the Mid-Season Invitational (MSI). Competing back again in Champions Summer 2014, while the team qualified for the playoffs, they were eliminated again the quarterfinals. At the 2014 League of Legends World Championship qualifiers, SKT faced Samsung Galaxy White a deciding qualifier match. In the match, Faker was the first player to die, known as giving away first blood, in three consecutive games, as SKT lost the match and did not qualify for the World Championship. In the following offseason, Riot Games changed the team regulations so that each organizations may only have one team participating in each league. This led to the merger of SK Telecom's two teams, SKT T1 K and SKT T1 S, to become simply SK Telecom T1.

Throughout the 2015 LCK season, Faker shared the mid lane position with Lee "Easyhoon" Ji-hoon. While Faker was the starter in the Spring Split season opener match against NaJin e-mFire, he was benched in the second game after losing the first, in favor of Easyhoon. However, he returned in the third game and won the match after securing a pentakill, the act of killing five opponents within 10 seconds of each other. In the 2015 LCK Spring Split finals, Easyhoon started all three games, as SKT went on to win the match. While technically winning another domestic title, Faker was unhappy with the results. "It feels good winning, but I'm left with a lot of regrets," he said. "Next time I play, I'll deliver a better performance than Easyhoon." In between splits, SKT competed in the 2015 Mid-Season Invitational and reached the finals, where they faced Edward Gaming in a best-of-five match. Easyhoon was the starter in the mid lane throughout the tournament, but SKT subbed in Faker for Game 4 of the finals, after SKT was down 1–2. They won Game 4, and for Game 5, Faker selected the character, or champion, LeBlanc, a champion who he had never lost a competitive game with. However, SKT lost the game, and the match, to finish in second place. In the 2015 LCK Summer Split, SKT once again reached the finals, where they faced KT Rolster. While Easyhoon had played in the majority of the matches throughout the split, Faker played in all three games of the finals and won the match to secure his fourth LCK title. At this point in his career Faker had been given many nicknames, including the "Unkillable Demon King" and simply "God".

SKT qualified for the 2015 League of Legends World Championship, and Faker had all but secured the starting mid lane role. Playing in only four of the matches throughout the tournament, Easyhoon played at Worlds only to "keep Faker's ego in check," according to SKT coaches. Over the course of the tournament, SKT lost only one game — Game 3 of the Finals against KOO Tigers — as the team went on to win their second Worlds title. With the win, Faker became one of two players to had ever won the title twice. Following the match, Faker ate a stalk of raw broccoli on stage.

Faker started 2016 by winning the international tournament IEM Season X World Championship, which was followed up with a finals win in the 2016 LCK Spring Split. With the win, SKT qualified for the 2016 Mid-Season Invitational, and while they went 6–4 in the group stage, they won title by sweeping the North American team Counter Logic Gaming in the finals. Faker finished the tournament with the second-most kills of any player and was named the MSI MVP, marking the first time had been named MVP at either MSI or Worlds. Faker hit a career milestone in the 2016 LCK Summer Split; on July 11, 2016, he became the first player to reach 1,000 kills in the LCK. While the team failed to win their fourth consecutive LCK title after losing to KT Rolster in the playoffs, they still qualified for the 2016 World Championship. The team reached the finals, where they defeated Samsung Galaxy in a 3–2 series. With the win, Faker had won his third world championship title, and he was named the MVP of the tournament. By the end of 2016, Faker was commonly referred to as "the Michael Jordan of esports."

Heading into the 2017 season, Faker renewed his contract with SKT, which was, according to an SKT press release, the "best contract in esports history." Faker picked up another LCK title in the 2017 LCK Spring Split, after SKT swept KT Rolster, 3–0, in the finals. At the 2017 Mid-Season Invitational, SKT topped the group stage with a 8–2 record and defeated G2 Esports in the finals to become the first team to win back-to-back Mid-Season Invitationals. However, back in the LCK, the team seemed to struggle in the Summer Split, often falling behind early in matches. Nonetheless, SKT reached the LCK Summer Finals, but they were defeated by Longzhu Gaming. SKT qualified for the 2017 World Championship, and they reached the finals once again; Faker was the only member of SKT that had made four World Championship final appearances. Prior to their finals matchup against Samsung Galaxy, Faker ranked second among all mid laners in the tournament in both kills and assists, and he ranked first in the number of unique champions played. SKT lost their finals match against Samsung Galaxy, 0–3, giving Faker his first World Championship finals loss. After the match, Faker was shown to be visibly upset and had to be consoled by his teammates to shake the Samsung Galaxy players' hands post-game.

International shortcomings (2018–2021) 
Following the 2017 season, SKT went into a semi-rebuild, and Faker struggled to find success throughout the 2018 season, losing a majority of his matches. The team finished in fourth place at the 2018 LCK Spring Split playoffs. Faker was benched in the 2018 LCK Summer split in favor of Choi "Pirean" Jun-sik, beginning on July 21, 2018. After SKT did not to reach the Summer Split playoffs, failing to advance past the group stage, Faker returned to the starting lineup for the LCK Regional Finals 2018, which act as qualifiers for the 2018 World Championship. However, SKT failed to make it to Worlds, either.

SKT overhauled their roster for the 2019 season while retaining Faker. Surrounded by talent, Faker won his seventh LCK title, after SKT defeated Griffin in the 2019 LCK Spring Split finals. In May 2019, SKT represented the LCK at the 2019 Mid-Season Invitational, where they ultimately fell to G2 Esports in the semifinals. Following the MSI, SKT competed in the 2019 Rift Rivals event, where teams from the LCK, LPL, LMS, and VCS competed. SKT, along with three other LCK teams, won their league's first Rift Rivals championship title after defeating LPL teams by 3–1. After winning his first Rift Rivals title, Faker became the first player to have won all of the Riot-organized League of Legends international tournaments — All-Star, Rift Rivals, the Mid-Season Invitational, and World Championship. The team's success began to fall off in the Summer Split, however; In June 2019, SKT found themselves in ninth place in the league and Faker was benched in a match against Griffin. Nonetheless, the team won the 2019 LCK Summer Split after defeating Griffin in the playoff finals, and Faker picked up his eighth LCK title. At the 2019 World Championship, Faker became the first player to win 100 international games, after SKT defeated Splyce in Game 2 of the quarterfinals. SKT lost to G2 Esports in the semifinals, marking the first time that Faker had been eliminated from Worlds in the knockout round.

Following the end of the 2019 season, SK Telecom T1 rebranded to simply T1. In February 2020, T1 announced that Faker had re-signed with them for three years. Additionally, Faker became a part owner of T1 Entertainment and Sports, taking on the position of a player-executive. Faker reached another career milestone in the 2020 LCK season; on March 5, 2020, he became the first player secure 2,000 kills in the LCK. Up to that point in his career, Faker had a win rate of 67.4% in the LCK, with 357 wins and 173 losses. Additionally, he surpassed Go "Score" Dong-bin for most games played in the LCK at 545 the following month. Faker won his ninth LCK championship on April 25, 2020, after SKT defeated Gen.G in the 2020 LCK Spring finals. However, in the Summer Split from July 2020 onwards, Faker was mostly benched in favor of Lee "Clozer" Ju-hyeon, who had turned 17 that month. In the first round of the Summer Split playoffs against Afreeca Freecs, Faker was subbed in for the second game of the match after T1 had lost the first. While T1 won game two, they lost the third and were eliminated from the playoffs. Faker was brought back into the starting roster in the LCK regional qualifier for the 2020 World Championship; while they defeated Afreeca Freecs in the semifinals, they lost to Gen.G in the finals.

In the 2021 LCK Spring Split, Faker benched himself after a loss to DRX on February 19, for three weeks, stating that he was not performing well and "needed some time." His return to the starting roster on March 13, 2021, resulted in a win over Gen.G. T1 lost in the Spring Split playoffs semifinals to Gen.G. The following split, T1 lost to DWG KIA in the finals. T1 qualified for the 2021 World Championship, after they defeated Hanwha Life Esports in the LCK Regional Finals. Faker was by far the most experienced player on his team at Worlds, having played over 150 games between MSI and Worlds, while his teammates had a combined 65. Nonetheless, T1 topped their group stage and made it to the semifinals, before they were defeated by DWG KIA.

Tenth domestic title (2022–present) 

In the offseason preceding the 2022 season, Faker's contract with T1 expired; according to T1 CEO Joe Marsh, he received and offer of $20million from a Chinese team compete in the LPL. However, Faker chose to stay with T1. The 2022 season marked Faker's 10th year as a professional. In the 2022 LCK Spring Split, Faker hit several career milestone. He became the first player to reach both 2,500 kills and 700 games in the LCK. Faker also played his 1,000th professional game on February 18, 2022, becoming the second player in League of Legends history to achieve the milestone. T1 finished the 2022 Spring Split with a perfect 18–0 regular season record, becoming the first team in the LCK to go undefeated in a split. Faker was also named to the LCK's first All-Pro team, marking the first time that he had been named to any All-pro team since 2020. T1 ran through the Spring Split playoffs, finishing it with a 3–1 win over Gen.G in the LCK Spring finals and capping off a perfect split. With the win, Faker claimed his 10th LCK title. At the 2021 Mid-Season Invitational, Faker reached the finals for the first time since 2017, after T1 defeated G2 Esports in the semifinals. T1's 26-game win streak came to an end, however, after they lost to Royal Never Give Up at the 2021 MSI finals. In the 2022 LCK Summer split, Faker became the first player to achieve 500 wins in the LCK, with his 500th win taking place on July 8 in a win over Gen.G. In the Summer Split playoffs, T1 was defeated by Gen.G in the finals.

T1 qualified for the 2022 World Championship; in a win over Cloud9 in the group stage on October 8, Faker became the first player to play 100 games — 72 wins and 28 losses — in the World Championship. He also surpassed Jian "Uzi" Zi-Hao for the most kills at the World Championship, with over 350 kills across multiple Worlds. Faker once again reached the World Championship finals, where T1 would face DRX, and Faker would face Kim "Deft" Hyeok-gyu, who attended the same high school as Faker. T1 came up short, however, losing to DRX by a score of 2–3.

Faker picked up another LCK record in the 2023 LCK Spring Split; on January 20, 2023, in a game against KT Rolster, Faker surpassed Kang "Gorilla" Beom-hyeon for the most career assists in the LCK at 4,137.

National team career 
Faker was selected to represent South Korea for the League of Legends demonstration event at the 2018 Asian Games. The team competed in the main event at the BritAma Arena at Mahaka Square in Jakarta, Indonesia, from August 27 to 29, 2018. In regards to playing at the Asian Games, Faker said that he felt more pressure than at standard League of Legends events due to "more diverse demographic of viewers" that were watching them. South Korea picked up a silver medal at the event after losing to China in the finals by a score of 1–3.

Media figure

Endorsements and television 
Faker has been used as a marketing tool for numerous brands, including Nike, Razer, Red Bull, and Creative Artists Agency. In 2017, he was an advertising model for the energy drink Bacchus in the Philippines. In 2020, Lotte Confectionery created a Faker brand of ice cream. In August 2020, he appeared in a commercial with professional footballer Son Heung-min to promote a series SK Telecom products. Razer created a customized "Faker Edition" of their DeathAdder V3 Pro mouse in 2023.

In November 2018, Faker appeared on the KBS2 talk show Hello Counselor. He was also featured a July 2020 episode of KBS2 esports talk show The Dreamer.

Philanthropy 
After missing out on the 2018 World Championship, Faker announced that he would be donating all of his revenue made from streaming in October 2018 to the UN Foundation.

Faker has made several donations to help the aid relief efforts in preventing the spread of COVID-19 in South Korea, although not always publicly. In March 2020, he announced that he would be donating  to the Community Chest of Korea. Two years later, in January 2022, he donated  to the Seoul Social Welfare Fund. Due to his contributions, his name was engraved at the wall of fame in the Gangseo District of Seoul.

In August 2022, Faker donated  to the Hope Bridge National Disaster Relief Association to help aid relief efforts of the victims of the 2022 floods in South Korea.

Streaming 
On February 6, 2017, Faker recorded his first livestream on Twitch and had a peak viewership of 245,100 viewers, setting a record for the most views for an individual streamer in the history of the site. However, this record was broken in early 2018 by League of Legends streamer Tyler1.

Litigation 
Minimal details of lawsuit were given, with the team's attorneys describing the group as "John Does" who made "slanders targeted towards Faker's mother and drawings that would be considered unspeakably foul." T1 CEO Joe Marsh clarified that the reason for the suit was not for the standard criticisms that come with being a public figure but rather for repeated comments fall into threats and harassment.

Seasons overview

Awards and honors 
International
 Three-time Worlds champion – 2013, 2015, 2016
 One-time Worlds Finals MVP – 2016
 Two-time Mid-Season Invitational champion – 2016, 2017
 One-time Mid-Season Invitational MVP – 2016

LCK
 10-time LCK champion – Summer 2013, Winter 2014, Spring 2015, Summer 2015, Spring 2016, Spring 2017, Spring 2019, Summer 2019, Spring 2020, Spring 2022
 Two-time LCK season MVP – Summer 2013, Winter 2014
 One-time LCK first All-Pro 1st Team – Spring 2022
 One-time LCK first All-Pro 2nd Team – Summer 2022
 One-time LCK first All-Pro 3rd Team – Spring 2020
 One-time LCK Most Improved Player – 2021
 One-time LCK Best Initiating Player – 2022

KeSPA
 One-time KeSPA League of Legends Mid Player Award – 2013
 Two-time KeSPA League of Legends Best Player – 2015, 2016
 Two-time KeSPA League of Legends Popularity Award – 2015, 2016
 Two-time KeSPA League of Legends eSports Award of the Year – 2015, 2016

Halls of Fame
 Esports Hall of Fame – 2019
 Three-time Korea Esports Hall of Fame Esports Star – 2018, 2019, 2020

Media
 Forbes 30 Under 30 Asia Entertainment & Sports – 2019.
 One-time The Game Awards Best Esports Player – 2017

Notes

References

External links 

 
 

Living people
South Korean esports players
Sportspeople from Seoul
1996 births
T1 (esports) players
League of Legends mid lane players
Twitch (service) streamers
Esports players at the 2018 Asian Games